Héctor Eduardo Vargas Bastidas (29 December 1951 – 7 March 2022) was a Chilean Roman Catholic prelate. He was Bishop of Arica from 25 November 2003 until 14 May 2013 and Bishop of Temuco from 14 May 2013 until his death. 

Vargas Bastidas died on 7 March 2022, at the age of 70.

References

External links

1951 births
2022 deaths
Chilean Roman Catholic bishops
21st-century Roman Catholic bishops in Chile
Bishops appointed by Pope John Paul II
People from Valdivia